Vârteșcoiu is a commune located in Vrancea County, Romania. It is composed of six villages: Beciu, Faraoanele, Olteni, Pietroasa, Râmniceanca and Vârteșcoiu.

References

Communes in Vrancea County
Localities in Muntenia